Qabqa or Chabcha is a town in Gonghe County, Qinghai, China. It is the seat of the Hainan Tibetan Autonomous Prefecture and the seat of Gonghe County. Qabqa has an altitude of 2835 m.

Qabqa had a population of 46,907 as of 2010. Qabqa is the political, economical, and cultural center of the Hainan Prefecture. China National Highway 214 passes through Qabqa.

References 

Populated places in Qinghai
Township-level divisions of Qinghai
Hainan Tibetan Autonomous Prefecture